Carassea is a genus of lichenized fungi in the family Cladoniaceae. The genus was circumscribed in 2002 by Finnish lichenologist Soili Stenroos. A monotypic genus, Carassea contains the single species Carassea connexa. This species, originally named Cladonia connexa, was first documented by Edvard August Wainio, who collected specimens from Minas Gerais, Brazil, in 1885, and published a description of the species in the first of his three-volume Monographia Cladoniarum universalis. The Cladoniaceae genera most closely related to Carassea include Pycnothelia and Metus.

References

Cladoniaceae
Lichen genera
Monotypic Lecanorales genera
Taxa described in 2002